Majken or Maiken is a Nordic female given name that may refer to
Maiken Caspersen Falla (born 1990), Norwegian cross-country skier
Majken Åberg (1918–1999), Swedish Olympic discus thrower
Majken Johansson (1930–1993), Swedish poet and writer
Majken Vange (born 1975), Danish Olympic badminton player
Majken Thorup (born 1979), Danish Olympic swimmer
Majken Christensen, Danish, Los Angeles-based musician